Sarah Bergbreiter is a professor of Mechanical Engineering at Carnegie Mellon University, previously a professor at the University of Maryland. Her research specifically has focused on microrobotics, with projects influencing the medicine and consumer electronic spheres. She has given TED Talks highlighting her micro robots that can jump over 80 times their height. One such micro robot is the 4 millimeter "flea".  She has won multiple awards for her work including the DARPA Young Faculty Award in 2008, the NSF CAREER Award in 2011, and the Presidential Early Career Award for Scientists and Engineers (PECASE) Award in 2013. Bergbreiter received her B.S.E degree in electrical engineering from Princeton University, and her M.S. and Ph.D. from the University of California, Berkeley.

References

Living people
American mechanical engineers
American roboticists
Women roboticists
Carnegie Mellon University faculty
Year of birth missing (living people)
American women engineers
21st-century American engineers
21st-century women engineers
University of Maryland, College Park faculty
Princeton University School of Engineering and Applied Science alumni
UC Berkeley College of Engineering alumni
21st-century American women
Recipients of the Presidential Early Career Award for Scientists and Engineers